The Fehmarn Sound Tunnel is a planned tunnel between the German mainland and the island of Fehmarn, which is projected to be built by 2028, to replace the Fehmarn Sound Bridge.  It is projected to cost €718 million. The tunnel will be near Großenbrode.

Background
The treaty of 2008 between Germany and Denmark provides that the hinterland connection to the Fehmarnbelt link is to be expanded on the German side, but the Fehmarnsund Crossing connection should remain two-lane road and single-track railway. The bridge was considered to be able to handle the increase of traffic.

It was later decided that the increase of traffic can't be handled by the existing Fehmarn Sound Bridge, especially the rail traffic.

In March 2020 the Federal Ministry for Transport and Digital Infrastructure and Deutsche Bahn announced that they compared all investigated variants and opted for an immersed tunnel for road and rail (estimated cost: 714 million euros) and that the Fehmarnsund Bridge is to be preserved.

Design

The design of the tunnel is very similar to the standard elements of the Fehmarn Belt Fixed Link currently being built. This is to be expected since both tunnels have been designed by groups with COWI involved. It has even been proposed to have the needed elements be built at the factory making the elements for the Fehmarn Belt Fixed Link, since the Fehmarn Sound is around 900 meters and the elements for the Fehmarn Belt Fixed Link is 217 meters so the Fehmarn Sound would consist of 4 or 5 such elements. Also, suggestions have been made to preserve the factory for future projects.

References

Buildings and structures in Schleswig-Holstein
2028 in rail transport
Railway tunnels in Germany
Immersed tube tunnels in Germany